The PS/ValuePoint (or just ValuePoint) personal computer was IBM's answer to the PC clone market, where the IBM PS/2 could not compete due to price and proprietary interfaces. Announced in October 1992 and withdrawn in July 1995, it was replaced by the IBM PC Series 300.

Specifications and history
These systems used standard ISA-bus architecture, SVGA graphics and IDE hard disks. Later models introduced VESA Local Bus and PCI.

Processors range from the 386SLC-25, 486SX-25, 486DX-33, and 486DX2-66 to the Pentium 60.

IBM PS/ValuePoints were shipped in the following form factors:
Space saving desktop introductory: IBM 6381 model #: /Si (3 expansion card slots & 3 drive bays)
Space saving desktop: IBM 6382 model #: /S (3 expansion card slots & 3 drive bays)
Desktop: IBM 6384 model #: /D (5 expansion card slots & 5 drive bays)
Mini Tower: IBM 8387 model #: /T (8 expansion slots & 6 drive bays)

Predecessor 
The IBM PS/ValuePoint series was preceded by these series:
 IBM PS/1
 IBM PS/2

Internal concurrents 
The IBM PS/ValuePoint series was sold concurrently with these series:
 IBM Aptiva and official Aptiva clones by AMBRA Computer Corporation

Successor 
The IBM PS/ValuePoint series was succeeded by these series: 
 IBM PC Series

ValuePoint models

Main line

Performance line

Budget line

Monitor 
The PS/ValuePoint was shipped with the following monitors:
 PS/2 8511, color (S)VGA (shipped with 325T) 
 6312, color (S)VGA
 6314, color (S)VGA
 6317, color (S)VGA
 6319, color (S)VGA

References

External links
IBM ValuePoint Personal Systems Reference Guide
German dealer listing with detailed model configuration info

PS ValuePoint
Computer-related introductions in 1992